Lilya Pavlovic Dear is born on 30 May 1947 1 in Topola-Oplenac, Serbia (ex-Yugoslavia). She is a Franco-American artist. Lilya Pavlovic Dear is a painter, print-maker, photographer and video artist. She has more than 200 group shows and 60 solo shows.

She exhibits in U.S.A, Europe and China. Some of her most important shows took place at the Library of Congress in Washington D.C., Fondazione Querini Stampalia, Venice during the 56th Venice Biennale, Museum of Shanxi province in Xi’An, Museum of Modern Art in Madrid. She has also won various awards, for example: Chevalier Artistique de Academia Internaticionale Greci Marino in Italy, Silver Medal for Mérite and Dévouement in the Arts Category in 1988, European Arts Prize Leopolde Senghore in 2007. She is in multiple private and public collections, such as Los Angeles County Museum, U.S.A Bibliothèque Nationale de France in Paris, France, Neue Galerie Graz, Austria, Museum of Art of Shanxi province in Xi’An, China.

Life and education 
Lilya got her B.A. in 1970 in Fresco, Painting and Mosaic at the Academy of Applied Arts in Belgrade. She obtained a scholarship from British Council and studied and graduated in Master of Fines Arts in Printmaking from Chelsea College of Arts / London University in London, in 1973. In 1974 she moved to Los Angeles where she exhibited and taught at UCLA from 1974 to 1977. Since the 1980s, she has been working and living between France and the United States of America.

Work 
She has worked on several themes throughout her career, some of the main ones being: Organic structures, Maps of the world, Marco Polo on the Silk Road, Angels, Water.

For the last 50 years, nature and ecology has always been present and has oriented her work.

The art critic Thomas Albright wrote about Lilya Pavlovic Dears work in the San Francisco Chronicle: “Imagine a cross between Dubuffet, Escher and William T. Wiley. Lilya is a kind of landscapist of the inner psyche whose principal tools are an intricate, all-encompassing web-like structure and a fantastic quality of interior space.”

The art critic Pierre Rouve said about her show in Bradford University “She portrays the unspoken and the unspeakable”.

Lilya has also published a book Marco Polo on the Silk Road in 2007. It is listed in several libraries: American Museum of Natural History ; National Art Library, Victoria and Albert Museum ; The British Library, St. Pancras ; Worcester Art Museum, Library of Congress ; New York Public Library ; Bibliothèque Marciana, Venice.

She received the Grand European Prize Botticelli in 2008, for her art book Marco Polo on the Silk Road.

The book Lilya art works 1970–2010, a retrospective book on her career is listed in the following institutions : Worcester Art Museum, Library of Congress, Smithsonian Institution Libraries, Los Angeles County Museum of Art.

Main exhibitions 
UNESCO, Venice, 2017 ; Fondazione Querini Stampalia, Venice, 2015 ; Museum of Art of Shanxi province in Xi’An, 2014, European Council of Europe, Strasbourg, 2013 ; Parish Gallery, Washington D.C., 2011 ; Fondation Taylor, Paris, 2011 ; AUP Gallery, Paris, 2010 ; Royal Geographical Society, London, 2010;

Bradford University, England 1973; Premi Internationale de Dessin Joan Miró, Barcelona 1973–75, 1981; Ljublijana International Graphic Arts Biennial, 1977 ; International Biennial of Young Artists from New York, 1977 ; Washington International Art Fair, 1977 ; Frederick Wight Gallery, Los Angeles, 1977 ; Salon d’Automne, Grand Palais, Paris, 1980, 86 ; Salon de Mai, Grand Palais, Paris, 1981, 87, 89 ; Museum of Modern Art  Madrid, 1981 ; Art and Architecture, UNESCO, Paris 1988, International Mini Print Exhibition, Cadaques, 1982–99 ; Salon Comparaisons, Grand Palais, Paris, 1988–98 ; Dix Ans d’Acquisitions, Bibliothèque Nationale de France, 1991 ; Salon Figuration Critique, Paris, 1996–98 ; SAGA, Paris, 1997 ; Triennale Mondiale d’Estampes Petit Format, Chamalières, 1997, 2000 ; UNESCO Museum, Beirut, 2000 ; Caelum Gallery, New York 2004; IPCNY, New York 2005; N.A.W.A Gallery, New York, 2009; Salon Capital / Comparisons, Paris, 2010; Fondation Paul Ricard, Ile de Bendor (France) 2011 ; Exposure Award at Louvre Museum, Paris, 2015.

Main collections 
Los Angeles County Museum, Los Angeles; Museum of Modern Art, Madrid ; Dix Ans d’Acquisitions, Bibliothèque Nationale de France, Paris; Minerve Museum, Yzeures ; Musée Juif, Musée Historique, Musée d’Arts décoratifs, Belgrade ; Musée Neue Galerie, Graz ; National Museum of Kraljevo, Kraljevo ;  ; Musée National de Kragujevac, Kragujevac ; New York Public Library, New York ; Art Bank, Washington D.C.

Listed in le Dictionnaire d’Art Bénézit, la Cotation d’Art Drouot, Dictionnaire d’Art Akoun.

Awards and honors 
Chevalier Artistique, Accademia Internacionale Greci Marino, Italie,  1998

Silver Medal, Arts Category, Mérite et Dévouement Français 1988

Médaille d’Argent dans la catégorie des Arts, Le Mérite et Dévouement Français, 1998

European Arts Prize, Léopold Senghor, 2007

Grand European Prize Botticelli 2008, for her art book Marco Polo on the Silk Road

Golden Medal for the work “Ancient China in the Eyes of Artists”, Guiyang, Confucius Academy, China, 2017 

Since 2019, she is an expert contributing at the Silk Sustainable Development Institution.

Private life 
Lilya Pavlovic Dear married Richard Hamilton Bryarlie Dear Junior in 1975. They have three daughters: Natasha Dear, Katarina Dear and Alexandra Dear.

References

1947 births
People from Topola
Alumni of the University of London
University of California, Los Angeles faculty
Living people